The 1972 Canadian Grand Prix was a Formula One motor race held at Mosport Park on 24 September 1972. It was race 11 of 12 in both the 1972 World Championship of Drivers and the 1972 International Cup for Formula One Manufacturers. The 80-lap race was won by Tyrrell driver Jackie Stewart after he started from fifth position. Peter Revson finished second for the McLaren team and his teammate Denny Hulme came in third.

As the Mont Tremblant circuit had been closed down because of a dispute with the local racing authorities, Mosport Park became the sole host of the Canadian Grand Prix. The circuit had been upgraded to meet modern racing standards.

Classification

Qualifying

Race

Championship standings after the race

Drivers' Championship standings

Constructors' Championship standings

Note: Only the top five positions are included for both sets of standings.

References

Canadian Grand Prix
Canadian Grand Prix
1972 in Canadian motorsport
Canadian Grand Prix
Grand Prix